is a 2008 film written and directed by Yōhei Fukuda. The film is based on the OneeChanbara video game series. It had a full theatrical release in Japan and it was shown in New York at the Asian Film Festival on June 20 and June 25, 2008, under the title of Chanbara Beauty. A straight-to-DVD sequel entitled お姉チャンバラ THE MOVIE vortex (or OneChanbara: Bikini Zombie Slayers in North America) was released in 2009.

Cast
Eri Otoguro as Aya, the main sword-wielding heroine
Chise Nakamura as Saki, Aya's younger sister
Manami Hashimoto as Reiko
Ai Hazuki as Maria

DVD releases
The DVD was released in Japan on September 26, 2008. The first press edition of the DVD had a 3D cover which flicks between Aya from the games and the live action portrayal. The film has been picked up for release in Germany, United States and the United Kingdom. It was released in Germany on 26 June 2009, carrying the title Zombie Killer – Sharp as a Sword, Sexy as Hell. Tokyo Shock in United States released the film on DVD under the title Onechanbara: Bikini Samurai Squad on August 25, 2009. Manga Entertainment is releasing the DVD in the UK on September 7, 2009, under the festival title of Chanbara Beauty.

See also
 List of films based on video games

References

External links

2008 films
2000s Japanese-language films
Live-action films based on video games
OneChanbara
Japanese zombie films
Tokyo Shock
Films directed by Yōhei Fukuda
2000s Japanese films

ja:お姉チャンバラ#お姉チャンバラ THE MOVIE